
Edward Jones (March 1752 – 18 April 1824) was a Welsh harpist, bard, performer, composer, arranger, and collector of music.  He was commonly known by the bardic name of "Bardd y Brenin", which he took in 1820, when King George IV, his patron, came to the throne.

Jones was born in Llandderfel, near Bala, and is remembered for his three-volume work, the Musical and Poetical Relicks of the Welsh Bards.

He first came to London in 1775, and was patronised by prominent Welshmen and by Charles Burney. He played in the Bach-Abel concerts which were London’s first subscription concert series, started in 1765. He became harp tutor to several wealthy families, and in about 1790 was made Harp-Master to the Prince of Wales. In 1805 he moved into the Office of the Robes, St James's Palace.

Jones suffered significant financial difficulties in his later life and, as well as seeking loans, was forced to sell some of his collection.

The remainder of his library was sold at auction the year following his death.

Works
The Musical and Poetical Relicks of the Welsh Bards (1784) 
The Bardic Museum (1802) Musical and Poetical Relics of the Welsh Bards; Preserved by Tradition from very remote antiquity. To the Bardic tunes are added Variations for the Harp, Piano-forte, Violin or Flute... Likewise a general history of the Bards, and Druids, from the earliest period to the present time.
Lyric Airs (1804)  consisting of Specimens of Greek, Albanian, Walachian, Turkish, Arabian, Persian, Chinese, and Moorish National Songs and Melodies (being the first selection of the kind ever yet offered to the public:) to which are added, Basses for the Harp, or Piano-forte. Likewise are subjoined, a few explanatory notes on the figures and movements of the Modern Greek Dances; with a short dissertation on the Origin of the Ancient Greek Music. Most respectfully dedicated to Mrs. Musters by the editor, Edward Jones, Bard to his Royal Highness the Prince of Wales.
A Selection of most Admired and Original German Waltzes, never before published; adapted for the Harp, or Piano-Forte.  (1806) 
Hen Ganiadau Cymru: Cambro-British melodies, or the national songs, and airs of Wales; consisting of ... songs, euphonies, flowers, elegies, marches, ... harp, or the piano-forte, violin, or flute, published 1820.

Three of his published works include frontispieces by Thomas Rowlandson.

Sources
Welsh Biography Online

References

External links

1752 births
1824 deaths
Welsh harpists
Welsh composers
Welsh male composers
Welsh-speaking musicians